The trial of Nicolae and Elena Ceaușescu was held on 25 December 1989 by an Exceptional Military Tribunal, a drumhead court-martial created at the request of a newly formed group called the National Salvation Front. Its outcome was pre-determined, and it resulted in guilty verdicts and death sentences for former Romanian President and Romanian Communist Party General Secretary, Nicolae Ceaușescu, and his wife, Elena Ceaușescu.

The main charge was genocide - namely, murdering "over 60,000 people" during the revolution in Timișoara. Other sources put the death toll between 689 and 1,200. Nevertheless, the charges did not affect the trial. General Victor Stănculescu had brought with him a specially selected team of paratroopers from a crack regiment, handpicked earlier in the morning to act as a firing squad. Before the legal proceedings began, Stănculescu had already selected the spot where the execution would take place: along one side of the wall in the barracks' square.

Nicolae Ceaușescu refused to recognize the tribunal, arguing its lack of constitutional basis and claiming that the revolutionary authorities were part of a Soviet plot.

Arrest
On 22 December 1989, during the Romanian Revolution, Nicolae and Elena Ceaușescu left the Central Committee building in Bucharest by helicopter toward Snagov, from which they left soon after towards Pitești. The helicopter pilot claimed to be in danger of anti-aircraft fire, so he landed on the Bucharest–Târgoviște road, near Găești. They stopped a car driven by a Dr. Nicolae Decă, who took them to Văcărești, after which he informed the local authorities that the Ceaușescus were going toward Târgoviște. The Ceaușescus took another car and told its driver, Nicolae Petrișor, to drive them to Târgoviște. During the trip, the Ceaușescus heard news of the revolution on the car radio (by then the revolutionaries had taken control of the state media), causing Ceaușescu to angrily denounce the revolution as a coup d'état. Petrișor took the couple to an agricultural centre near Târgoviște, where they were locked in an office and were later arrested by soldiers from a local army garrison.

Creation of the tribunal
As the new authorities heard the news of their apprehending from General Andrei Kemenici, the commander of the army unit, they began to discuss what to do with the Ceaușescus. Victor Stănculescu, who was Ceaușescu's last defence minister before going over to the revolution, wanted a quick execution, as did Gelu Voican Voiculescu. Ion Iliescu, Romania's provisional president, supported holding a trial first.

During the evening of 24 December 1989, Stănculescu sent the secret code "recourse to the method" to Kemenici, referring to the execution of the Ceaușescus. A ten-member tribunal was formed to try the case. The members of the panel were all military judges.

The Independent characterized the trial as "what can best be described as an egregiously conducted summary trial, at worst a kangaroo court".

Charges
The charges were published in Monitorul Oficial the day after the execution:
 Genocide – over 60,000 victims
 Subversion of state power by organising armed actions against the people and state power.
 Offence of destruction of public property by destroying and damaging buildings, explosions in cities, etc.
 Undermining the national economy.
 Trying to flee the country using over $1 billion deposited in foreign banks.

Counsel for the defence
The morning of the trial, prominent lawyer Nicu Teodorescu was having Christmas breakfast with his family when he was telephoned by an aide to Iliescu, and asked by the National Salvation Front to be the Ceaușescus' defence counsel. He replied that it would be "an interesting challenge". Teodorescu met the couple for the first time in the Târgoviște "court room", when he was given ten minutes to consult with his clients. With so little time to prepare any defence, he tried to explain to them that their best hope of avoiding the death sentence was to plead insanity. The Ceaușescus brushed off the idea; according to Teodorescu, "When [he] suggested it, Elena in particular said it was an outrageous set-up. They felt deeply insulted...They rejected [his] help after that."

Trial
The trial of Nicolae and Elena Ceaușescu was very brief, lasting approximately one hour. Ceaușescu defended himself by arguing that the tribunal was against the 1965 Constitution of Romania and that only the Great National Assembly had the power to depose him. He argued that it was a coup d'état organized by the Soviets.

Nicolae and Elena Ceaușescu were convicted of all charges and condemned to death in what amounted to a show trial. At one point, their forcibly-assigned lawyers abandoned their clients' defence and joined with the prosecutor, accusing them of capital crimes instead of defending them. No offer of proof was made for the Ceaușescus' alleged crimes. They were tried based on references, solely by offense-name or hearsay, to criminal acts they had committed in the opinion of prosecutors, or as alleged in press reports. Various irregularities presented themselves, or became apparent post-trial:
 The trial was held immediately, without a prior criminal investigation.
 The suspects were not examined psychiatrically, which was mandatory by law.
 The suspects could not choose their own lawyers.
 An accusation of genocide was never proven. Four top Ceaușescu aides later admitted complicity in genocide in 1990. Pro TV stated that there were 860 people killed after 22 December 1989 (i.e. when the dictatorial couple was no longer in charge). Another source gives the figure of 306 people killed 17–22 December 1989.
 The court did not attempt to find and prove the truth. There was no file of evidence presented to the court.
 The Ceaușescus were accused of having $1 billion in foreign bank accounts. No such accounts have ever been found.
 Nicolae Ceaușescu openly disavowed the court. One of the Ceaușescus' lawyers suggested before the execution that since the pair did not recognize the tribunal, there was no avenue for appealing the verdict.
 The judges' verdict allowed for appealing to a higher court. The Ceaușescus were executed a few minutes after the verdict, rendering that provision moot.
 The person who signed the decree for organizing the court, coup leader Ion Iliescu, lacked legal power to do so. The order was handwritten in a lavatory in the Romanian Ministry of Defence.
 Romanian law prohibited carrying out the death sentence less than ten days after a guilty verdict to allow time by the defendant's lawyers to file an appeal. After the Ceaușescus' execution, the death penalty was abolished in Romania.
 The coup leaders said the execution of the Ceaușescus was necessary to stop terrorists from attacking the new political order. No terrorists or terrorist cells were found to have been active in Romania. A newer insight of prosecution of "crimes against humanity" claims that the new regime orchestrated "a psychosis of terrorism" through diversionary actions.
 Initially Iliescu did not wish to carry out the executions immediately, and he instead favored a formal trial to be carried out several weeks later. General Victor Stănculescu insisted on the couple's hasty execution as an imperative for the Romanian Army supporting the newly created National Salvation Front. After a few hours of debating this option, Iliescu agreed with Stănculescu and signed the decree for organizing the court.

Execution
The Ceaușescus were executed at 4:00 p.m. local time at a military base outside Bucharest on 25 December 1989. The execution was carried out by a firing squad consisting of paratroop regiment soldiers: Captain Ionel Boeru, Sergeant-Major Georghin Octavian and Dorin-Marian Cirlan, while reportedly hundreds of others also volunteered. Before the execution, Nicolae Ceaușescu declared, "We could have been shot without having this masquerade!" The Ceaușescus' hands were tied by four soldiers before the execution. Simon Sebag Montefiore wrote that, before the sentences were carried out, Elena Ceaușescu screamed, "You sons of bitches!" as she was led outside and lined up against the wall, while Nicolae Ceaușescu sang "The Internationale".

The firing squad began shooting as soon as the two were in position against a wall. The execution happened too quickly for the television crew assigned to the trial and death sentence to videotape it in full; only the last round of shots was filmed. In 2014, retired Captain Boeru told a reporter for The Guardian newspaper that he believes that the shots he fired from his rifle were solely responsible for the deaths of both of the Ceaușescus, because, of the three soldiers in the firing squad, he was the only one who remembered to switch his Kalashnikov rifle to fire fully automatic, and at least one member of the group hesitated to shoot for several seconds. In 1990, a member of the National Salvation Front reported that 120 bullets were found in the couple's bodies.

In 1989, Prime Minister Petre Roman told French television that the execution was carried out quickly due to rumors that loyalists would attempt to rescue the couple.

Burial
After the execution, the bodies were covered with canvas. The Ceaușescus' corpses were taken to Bucharest and buried in Ghencea Cemetery on 25 December 1989.

The bodies were exhumed for identification and reburied in 2010. Groups of Ceaușescu supporters visit to place flowers on the grave, with large numbers of pensioners gathering on 26 January, Nicolae's birthday.

Release of the images
The hasty trial and the images of the dead Ceaușescus were videotaped and the footage promptly released in numerous Western countries two days after the execution. Later that day, it was also shown on Romanian television.

Reactions
In 2009 Valentin Ceaușescu, elder son of the Ceaușescus, argued that the revolutionary forces should have killed his parents when they had arrested them on 22 December since they did not need any trial. After making vague comments about the incident, Ion Iliescu stated that it was "quite shameful, but necessary". In a similar vein, Stănculescu told the BBC in 2009 that the trial was "not just, but it was necessary" because the alternative would have been seeing Nicolae lynched on the streets of Bucharest.

Several countries criticized the new rulers of Romania after the execution due to lack of public trial. The United States was the most prominent critic of the trial, stating: "We regret the trial did not take place in an open and public fashion."

Aftermath
In December 2018, Iliescu, former Deputy Prime Minister Gelu Voican Voiculescu, former Romanian Air Force chief Iosif Rus, and former National Salvation Front council member Emil Dumitrescu were indicted by Romanian military prosecutors for crimes against humanity for the deaths that occurred during the Romanian Revolution, most of which took place after Ceaușescu was overthrown. The indictment also made reference to the conviction and execution of the Ceaușescus "after a mockery of a trial". The investigation that led to the indictments had previously been closed in 2009, but was re-opened in 2016 as the result of a trial at the European Court of Human Rights. On 1 March 1990, Colonel Gică Popa, who presided over the trial and was promoted to General, was found dead in his office. His death was ruled a suicide. The Ceaușescus were the last people to be executed in Romania before the abolition of capital punishment on 7 January 1990.

Notes

References

External links

1989 in law
1989 in Romania
1980s trials
Abuse of the legal system
December 1989 events in Europe
Ceausescu
History of Târgoviște
Nicolae Ceaușescu
Romanian Revolution
Trials of political people
Trials in Romania

fr:Révolution roumaine de 1989#Fuite et mort du dictateur